Liaison means communication between two or more groups, or co-operation or working together.

Liaison or liaisons may refer to:

General usage
 Affair, an unfaithful sexual relationship
 Collaboration
 Co-operation

Arts and entertainment
 Liaisons (Desperate Housewives), a 2007 episode of the American drama series
 Liaisons (Star Trek: The Next Generation), a 1993 American sci-fi episode
 "Liaisons", a song from Stephen Sondheim's 1973 musical A Little Night Music
 Les Liaisons dangereuses,  a 1782 French novel by Pierre Choderlos de Laclos
 Liaisons: Re-Imagining Sondheim from the Piano, a 2015 album by Anthony de Mare
 Liaison (TV series), a British–French series on Apple TV+

Businesses and organisations
 Air Alliance, a defunct Canadian airline (call sign: Liaison)
 Liaison Agency Flanders-Europe, a Flemish government body
 Liaison Committee (House of Commons of the United Kingdom), of the UK Parliament's lower house
 Liaison Committee (House of Lords), of the UK Parliament's upper house
 Liaison Committee on Medical Education, an accreditation body for Northern American schools of medicine

Military
 Liaison aircraft, a small aircraft used by military forces
 Liaison pilot, a World War II pilot who flew liaison aircraft
 Liaison Pilot Badge, a qualification badge issued by the United States Army Air Forces during World War II
 Liaison officer, a military officer who coordinates different forces or national units usually at Staff level
 Military Liaison Element, US special forces personnel attached to embassies
 Military liaison missions, Cold War military intelligence missions in Germany

Science
 Liaison (French), a phonological phenomenon in the French language
 Liaison psychiatry, a medical field treating mental conditions comorbid with physiological ones

Waterways
 Liaison Dunkerque-Escaut, series of canals in France

See also
 Pearl (drag queen), sometimes known as Pearl Liaison
 Liaisons dangereuses (disambiguation)